Cyril Pullin (18 August 1892 – 23 April 1973) was a British inventor, engineer and motorcycle race driver. His inventions contributed to the rotary engine and the helicopter. His son was the pilot for the first successful British helicopter flight in 1938. Cyril Pullin died in 1973 aged 80.

Early life
Cyril George Pullin was born 1892 in Wandsworth, London. He became a well known motorcycle racer and in 1914 won the Isle of Man TT race.

Racing career

In 1914 Cyril Pullin won the Isle of Man TT with a record average of 49.49 mph on a Rudge Multi which had a variable belt drive gearbox giving an effective option of over 20 speeds which made a huge difference on the hills. The race, which ran for over four hours was led by Oliver Godfrey (riding an Indian) and Howard R Davies (on a Sunbeam) who dead heated for second place when Pullin overtook them both to win by only 6.4 seconds. Pullin's success on the day was sadly marred when fellow competitor in the Junior TT Frank Walker came round the final corner on his Royal Enfield to find the road blocked by people trying to see the finish. He did his best to avoid injuring spectators but was killed in the crash. Following the tragedy the organisers of the TT introduced rope barriers and crowd control.

On 23 March 1922 at Brooklands Pullin established a new record and became the first ever British motorcyclist to be timed at over 100 m.p.h. on a 3 hp Douglas 500cc motorcycle.

Inventions

In the 1920s Pullin developed various helicopter engine patents and in the 1940s he developed the Powerwheel, a rotary engine in the hub of a motorcycle wheel, a rotating single-cylinder engine known as a one-lunger. This consisted of just the cylinder and a clutch which could be engaged and disengaged, with a simple drum brake. The invention never entered production but is credited as an important step in rotary engine development.

His sister was married to Stephen Leslie Bailey, a then prominent engineer at Douglas Motorcycles and many of his patents were filed under the name of that company.

Car and motorcycle business
In 1928 Pullin took over the former Phoenix factory in Letchworth, Hertfordshire, to produce Ascot-Pullin Motorcycles and the Ascot car based on the Hungarian Fejes, with chassis and 10 hp engine assembled from welded steel pressings. It never went into production.

A larger car, the Ascot Gold Cup Six with a 2423 cc six-cylinder engine possibly made by Continental, three-speed gearbox and servo brakes did become a reality and a few production cars were made. It was advertised as being available as a two-seat sports, coupé or fabric saloon.

Rotary wing aircraft
In 1932 Pullin joined G & J Weir Ltd's aircraft department, in Glasgow, Scotland, as chief designer to develop single-place autogyros. Pullin and his team designed a series of Autogiros before moving on to a small helicopter using two rotors mounted atop outriggers each side of the fuselage. The Weir W.5 was a single-seat helicopter powered by an air-cooled engine, and established a maximum airspeed of 70 mph. Its two two-blade, fixed-pitch rotors had swashplate-actuated cyclic control. The W.5 made its first flight at Dalrymple, Ayrshire, on 7 June 1938, when it was piloted by Raymond Pullin and it became the first British helicopter to fly successfully. By World War II the W.5 had logged eighty hours' flying time and was followed by a scaled-up version, the W.6, which was the first two-seater helicopter in the world, powered by a much more powerful DH Gipsy aero engine. Further progress on this model was prevented by World War II.

Pullin designed the 1500 cc "Flat Twin" and the "4-Cylinder"(later called Pixie when licensed to Aero Engines Ltd of Bristol) engines which followed it. These were used in the Weir W2, W3 and W4 autogiros. The "Four Cylinder" was adapted to power the twin-rotor W5 Helicopter.

After the war development at the Cierva Autogiro Company of the W.9 "Drainpipe" and the 24-passenger-carrying W.11 Air Horse helicopters continued under the direction of Cyril Pullin. A fatal crash of the W11 Air Horse, due to a small component fatigue failure, put an end to this very promising heavy-lift helicopter project. The remnants of the Cierva Autogiro Company were taken over by Saunders Roe, who continued the development of the small Skeeter helicopter and put it into production.

See also
 Ascot (1928 automobile)
 Fairey FB-1 Gyrodyne

References

Sources
Douglas Light Aero Engines from Kingswood to Cathcart. 2010. Author Brian Thorby. Redcliffe Press, Bristol

External links 
1914 picture of 21-year-old Cyril Pullin on his winning motorcycle. It was an earlier model which he had designed. This site is about the TT race, and tells the story of the race and the motorcycle design
Cyril Pullin's patents. This site about old Douglas motorcycle parts digs into old engine and motor patents, specifically following various stages of Cyril Pullin's work and inventions
Image of Pullin riding motorcycle in 1923
 TT database rider profile 
 TT database TT results

1890s births
1973 deaths
British motorcycle pioneers
People from Wandsworth
British automobile designers
English motorcycle racers
Isle of Man TT riders
Aircraft designers
English aerospace engineers